The Anglican Diocese of Egbu is one of twelve within the Anglican Province of Owerri, itself one of fourteen provinces within the Church of Nigeria: the current bishop is Geoffrey Enyinnaya Okorafor.

Notes

Dioceses of the Province of Owerri
 
Egbu